Bhawana (also spelled as Bhowana) (Punjabi) is a sub-division (tehsil) of Chiniot District in Punjab, Pakistan. Before February 2009, it was a part of Jhang district as a sub-division (sub-tehsil) of Chiniot Tehsil.

References 

Chiniot District
Populated places in Chiniot District
Tehsils of Punjab, Pakistan